The term a sliding doors moment became a term popularised in the late 20th-century meaning seemingly inconsequential moments that nonetheless alter the trajectory of future events.

Uses
Although the term originated from the 1998 film Sliding Doors, written and directed by Peter Howitt and starring Gwyneth Paltrow, the concept was explored earlier by J. B. Priestley in his 1932 play Dangerous Corner.

Examples of 'sliding doors moments' being used in modern vernacular include:
Princess Diana's last minute decision to make a trip to Paris. 
In relation to  Labor Party ahead of a byelection for Longman. 
The fortunes of the Croatian national football team ahead of the 2018 FIFA World Cup in which they would eventually finish as runners-up despite struggling through qualifying. 
Personal relationships. 
The chequered history of Roxy Music. 
The drop in funding of the NHS.
 A round table discussion on the Set Piece Menu podcast on how football history might have changed if certain key moments had gone differently, such as England’s 1966 World Cup victory masking wider deficiencies in the post-war state of English football, and the seemingly opportunistic 1992 signing of Eric Cantona by then Manchester United manager Sir Alex Ferguson, amongst others.
 Bill Simmons frequently declares events to be sliding door moments in the history of the National Basketball Association and its players, teams, coaches and staff on the Bill Simmons Podcast and the Book of Basketball podcast. 
Australian bowler Glenn McGrath injuring himself in the warm-up to the 2nd test of the 2005 Ashes series, meaning he couldn't play in the match. Australia would go on to narrowly lose the match, and after levelling the series 1-1 England would go on to win their first Ashes series since 1986-87.

See also
 Butterfly effect
 Time loop
 Parallel universe
 Blind Chance, Krzysztof Kieślowski, 1987, filmed in 1981
 Run Lola Run, Tom Tykwer, 1998
 Frasier season 8, episode 13, "Sliding Frasiers"
 Broad City season 4, episode 1, "Sliding Doors"
 Unbreakable Kimmy Schmidt, season 4, episode 9, "Sliding Van Doors"

References

Popular culture